The Shadow Cabinet of the 42nd Legislative Assembly of British Columbia, constituting members of the opposition BC Liberal Party, was announced by Opposition Leader Kevin Falcon on December 8, 2022.

List

See also
 Official Opposition Shadow Cabinet of the 38th Legislative Assembly of British Columbia
 Official Opposition Shadow Cabinet of the 40th Legislative Assembly of British Columbia
Cabinet of Canada
Official Opposition (Canada)
Shadow Cabinet
Official Opposition Shadow Cabinet (British Columbia)

References

External links
 https://www.bcliberals.com/team/ on BC Liberal website

Politics of British Columbia